Mammillaria prolifera is a species of cactus in the subfamily Cactoideae, with the common name Texas nipple cactus.

References

Plants described in 1812
prolifera